Edwin Wilbur Rice Jr. (6 May 1862 in La Crosse, Wisconsin – 25 November 1935 in Schenectady, New York) was a president and considered one of the three fathers of General Electric (along with Elihu Thomson  and Charles A. Coffin).

Early life 
He attended the Boys' Central High School in Philadelphia and was a student of Elihu Thomson. Rice graduated in 1880 and considered going to Yale but decided to join Thomson in New Britain, Connecticut, at the American Electric Company as Thomson's assistant at $30 a month.

Career 
In 1883 he continued with Thomson, and moved from New Britain to Lynn, Massachusetts, to work for the newly formed Thomson-Houston Electric Company. There he worked on converting Thomson's inventions into manufactured products. In 1885 he became the factory superintendent when John Meech moved to Europe to head up Thomson-Houston International. Under Rice the Lynn factory grew from almost nothing in 1883 to an enterprise with $10 million in sales and 4,000 employees in 1892.  Primary products included arc light systems, electrical generators, dynamos, meters, transformers, and electric motors. By 1892 the primary products were electric trolley car systems and the company had built over 2700 electric trolley cars and 870 electric generator stations. The entire factory reported to Rice and in 1890 supervisors who reported to him included D. M. Barton - Production Manager, I. F. Baker - Mechanical Superintendent, G. E. Emmons - Factory Auditor, W. H. Knight - Chef Electrical Engineer, and A. I. Rohrer - Chef Assistant.

In 1892 General Electric Company was created after a merger with Edison General Electric. Rice was originally its technical director. He became, in 1896, vice president in charge of manufacturing and engineering, and eventually senior vice president. In 1913 he was chosen president of the company replacing Charles A. Coffin who moved on to be the chairman of the board of GE. When Rice retired in 1922 was made honorary chairman of the board.

Rice was elected president in 1917 of the American Institute of Electrical Engineers (AIEE).

In 1931 the AIEE awarded him the Edison Medal "For his contributions to the development of electrical systems and his encouragement of scientific research in industry."

References

 Hammond, John Winthrop. Men and Volts, the Story of General Electric, publishecd 1941. Citations: personal interest in young experts - 166, steam turbine interest - 275; work on Niagara power plant plans 235; superintendent at Lynn - 87; Thomson-Houston organization plan 102; Technical Director of GE 197; VP in charge of Engineering and Manufacturing 247; President of GE 349; Honorary Chairman of the Board 382.
 Carlson, W. Bernard. Innovation as Social Progress, Elihu Thomson and the Rise of General Electric, 1870-1900, published 1991, Cambridge University Press.

External links
 IEEE Legacies Bio
Hall of History

1862 births
1935 deaths
People from La Crosse, Wisconsin
American electrical engineers
IEEE Edison Medal recipients
General Electric people
Members of the American Philosophical Society